Anisopodus melzeri is a species of beetle in the family Cerambycidae. It was described by Gilmour in 1965. The species are named after entomologist Melzer.

References

Anisopodus
Beetles described in 1965